Sven Schaffrath (born July 13, 1984 in Düren) is a German footballer who most recently played for Alemannia Aachen.

References

1984 births
Living people
German footballers
Bayer 04 Leverkusen II players
Wuppertaler SV players
Rot Weiss Ahlen players
FC Erzgebirge Aue players
Alemannia Aachen players
VfB Lübeck players
2. Bundesliga players
3. Liga players
Association football defenders
People from Düren
Sportspeople from Cologne (region)
Footballers from North Rhine-Westphalia